Ivan Klepić (born 12 October 1994) is a top Bosnian karate competitor and current European champion in the +84 kg category for men.

Klepić was born in Mostar, Bosnia and Herzegovina.

Achievements
2018
  European Championship – 12 May, Novi Sad, SER – kumite +84 kg

References

1994 births
Living people
Bosnia and Herzegovina male karateka